West Didsbury & Chorlton Association Football Club is a semi-professional football club based in Chorlton-cum-Hardy, a suburb of Manchester, England. Nicknamed "West", the club was founded as Christ Church in 1908. In 1920, the club changed its name to West Didsbury, and after moving to their current stadium, Brookburn Road, in Chorlton in 1997 they changed their name to West Didsbury & Chorlton to reflect this.

West spent most of its history in the Lancashire and Cheshire League, then joined the Manchester League Division One in 2006. After gaining promotion to the Manchester League Premier Division and entering the FA Vase in 2011, the club was accepted into the North West Counties Football League Division One for the 2012–13 season, and gained promotion to the Premier Division after just one season.

History
The club was formed in West Didsbury as Christ Church A.F.C. in 1908 by a local Sunday School Superintendent. Christ Church joined the Manchester Alliance League, in which they played until 1914. For the 1920–21 season, the club changed its name to West Didsbury A.F.C. and joined the Lancashire and Cheshire League. West played at the top level of this league for many years, finishing runners-up four times and winning the Rhodes cup in 1932. The club was relegated in 1951–52 but were promoted back the following year. In 1959–60, West were again relegated, but this time took six years to regain a place in Division One. This was short-lived, however, as West were relegated again in 1968–69. Despite this, the club won the Rhodes cup for the second time in 1969–70. After again achieving promotion to Division One in 1970–71, two relegations in three years saw West playing in the Lancashire and Cheshire League Division Three, in which they stayed until the late 1980s. In the 1987–88 and 1988–89 season the club achieved back to back promotions as champions.

In 2003, the club changed its name to West Didsbury & Chorlton, to reflect its new location after an earlier ground move. In 2006, they entered the Manchester League Division One, won two Murray Shields in three seasons, and were crowned champions in 2010–11, gaining promotion to the Premier Division. In the 2011–12 season, the club played in the FA Vase for the first time, and were knocked out in the Second Qualifying Round by Ashville F.C. For the 2012–13 season the club had its application to enter the North West Counties Football League Division One accepted. This was the first time the club has played at level 10 of the English football league system. The club finished 3rd in their first season at level 10, and due to the failure to meet ground criteria of title winner Formby, West Didsbury were promoted to level 9 for the 2013–14 season for the first time. They also won the NWCFL Division One Cup competition defeating Abbey Hey 1–0 in the final. West Didsbury were relegated back to Division One South in the 2018–19 season.

After the 2019–20 and 2020–21 seasons were curtailed due to the Covid-19 pandemic, the club won promotion back to the Premier Division in 2021–22, securing their finish as champions on 23 March 2022 with a 2–1 win over Barnton.

Colours
West's colours are white and black shirts, with black shorts and socks. The away kit is pink and blue shirts and shorts, with pink socks.

Grounds

The club originally played at Christie Playing Fields, but this ground was sold off. The club moved to Brookburn Road in Chorlton for the 1997–98 season and later changed their name to reflect this.

Support
The club typically draws support from the wider Chorlton-cum-Hardy area, with a small proportion drawing from the team's historical roots in West Didsbury. In recent times, the team have been noted for their celebrity support, including local indie pop band Dutch Uncles, who launched their fourth album O Shudder at a game in 2014. The band form part of the club's Krombacher Ultras faction who take their name from Krombacher beer, a beverage sold in West Didsbury's clubhouse throughout matches. England international players Marcus Rashford and Izzy Christiansen have also attended West games.

In anticipation of the 2020–21 season an independent supporters club, Union 1908, was formed by West supporters with the aim of expanding the clubs fanbase, along with supporting local causes in the South Manchester area.

West fans have been noted for their creative & humorous chants, often singing songs about humous, quinoa, vegetarianism, Bird's Eye Potato Waffles, and their love of Krombacher. 
In a similar fashion to fans of fellow non-league clubs such as Clapton CFC, Dulwich Hamlet, & Eastbourne Town FC, West fans are known for their left-wing political stance. Antifascist, LGBT, & pro-refugee flags are flown at most games.

Players
.

Honours
West Didsbury & Chorlton has won five league championships and six cup competitions in its history.

Manchester League Division One
Winners 2010–11
Runners-up 2009–10
North West Counties Football League Division One South
Winners 2021–22
North West Counties Football League Division One Cup
Winners 2013–14
Lancashire FA Trophy
Runners-up 2021-22
Lancashire and Cheshire League Division One
Runners-up 1922–23, 1931–32
Lancashire and Cheshire League Division Two
Winners 1988–89
Runners-up 1952–53, 1965–66, 1970–71
Lancashire and Cheshire League Division Two
Winners 1987–88
Murray Shield
Winners 2007–08, 2009–10
Runners-up 2008–09
Rhodes Cup
Winners 1926–27, 1969–70
Runners-up 1922–23, 1931–32
Whitehead Cup
Winners 1976–77

Club records

FA Cup
First Qualifying Round 2022-23
FA Vase
Semi-finals 2022–23

Notable players
Players in this list have either played professionally, internationally or are otherwise of note before, during or after their time at West Didsbury & Chorlton.

 Jeff Tate
 Jamie Coombes
 Carlos Mendes Gomes
 Paul Heaton
 James Hooper
 Remy Longdon
 John Pritchard
 Jack Sergeant

References

External links

Football clubs in England
Football clubs in Manchester
North West Counties Football League clubs
Association football clubs established in 1908
1908 establishments in England